The Ghost Shadows or GSS was a Chinese American street gang that was prominent in New York City's Chinatown from the early 1970s to the mid 1990s. Formed in 1971 by immigrants from Taiwan and Hong Kong, the gang is affiliated with the On Leong Tong. They adopted the colors black and white as their clothing to match the name of the set. Throughout the 80s, the gang was often engaged in bloody turf wars with other Chinatown gangs such as the older Flying Dragons, affiliated with Hip Sing Tong and the Division Street Boys affiliated with Tung On Association, and their activities included extortion, kidnapping, murder, racketeering, drug trafficking and illegal gambling. The Ghost Shadows' influence was widespread, having links to Chinatowns in other cities as well as links to Sicilian-American Mafia families. The organization is defunct due to Federal RICO crackdowns during the 1990s.

Members

Wing Yeung Chan
Wing Yeung Chan was president of On Leong Tong and for a decade the leader of the Ghost Shadows. Charged with murder and racketeering, he was sentenced to 10 years imprisonment.

Applehead
Applehead (pronounced Apo with silent-L) one of the original founders of Ghost Shadows and a leader of breakaway factions of Ghost Shadows Bayard Boys during the late 1970s up to his indictments on RICO statutes in the mid-1980s.

References

External links
 Chinese – Asian Organized Crime Groups: Tongs and Street Gangs. Information on Ghost Shadows from MafiaNJ.com.
  http://www.nychinatown.org/articles/voice19770131.html
 
 

Chinese-American organized crime groups
Chinese-American culture in New York City
Former gangs in New York City
Street gangs
Triad groups